Rally Cross is a racing video game developed by Sony Interactive Studios America and published by Sony Computer Entertainment for the PlayStation. A sequel was released in 1998 titled Rally Cross 2.

Gameplay
The game supports up to four players via a split screen.

Reception

Critics typically compared the game to Sega Rally Championship, identifying the major difference from the Sega game as the more dramatic consequences of driving over unfavorable terrain, which results in an emphasis on careful driving rather than speed. Opinions on this aspect of the game varied. Kraig Kujawa, who reviewed Rally Cross in both Electronic Gaming Monthly and GamePro, hailed it as a major innovation for the racing genre, assessing that it makes the game more realistic and creates a more intelligent challenge. Kujawa's EGM co-reviewer Dean Hager noted that it results in slower racing, but agreed that the overall experience is more challenging and overall better than Sega Rally Championship. A reviewer for Next Generation echoed Hager to an extent: "What the game lacks in outright speed, however, is more than made up for by the strategy that is required to select the best line through the undulating tracks." However, he argued that the ease with which cars are flipped over is unrealistic and results in a frustratingly steep learning curve, and concluded the gameplay to ultimately fall second to that of Sega Rally Championship. GamePros Dr. Zombie took a fairly neutral position, noting that the unique racing style can be mastered but might be disappointing to players who like high-speed racing.

Critics almost unanimously praised the detailed graphics and the high level of replayability resulting from the large number of tracks, variety of vehicles, numerous modes, and four-player capability.

References

External links
 

1997 video games
Multiplayer and single-player video games
Off-road racing video games
PlayStation (console) games
PlayStation (console)-only games
Sony Interactive Entertainment games
Sony Interactive Entertainment franchises
Video games developed in the United States